Imperial Academy may refer to:

 The Imperial Academy of Arts in St Petersburg
 The Russian Academy of Sciences in Moscow (old name)
 The former Imperial Military Academy in St Petersburg
 The Imperial Academy of Arts in Vienna, now the Academy of Fine Arts Vienna
 The Imperial Academy of Music in Vienna, now the University of Music and Performing Arts, Vienna
 The Imperial Academy of Sciences in Vienna, now the Austrian Academy of Sciences
 The former Imperial Iranian Academy of Philosophy, in Tehran
 The former Imperial Academy of Letters, Arts, and Sciences of Ethiopia, in Addis Ababa
 The Taixue, the highest institution of learning in Han dynasty China
 The Guozijian, the highest institution of learning in China from the Sui dynasty to the Qing dynasty
 Guozijian (Beijing)
 The Hanlin Academy in Imperial China
 The fictional Imperial Academy in the Star Wars series
 Imperial Ballet Academy
 Imperial Military Academy
 Imperial Academy, Huế, in the old capital city Huế was the national academy during the Nguyễn Dynasty in Vietnam